This is a list of the 35 observers to the European Parliament for Romania in the 2004 to 2009 session. They were appointed by the Chamber of Deputies to be observers from 25 September 2005 until 31 December 2006 (one day before the accession of Romania to the European Union). The observers group included 9 women. 12 of them joined EPP-ED, 12 joined PES, 7 joined ALDE, while the rest remained Non-Inscrits.

List

References

Sources
 

List
Romania
2005
Romania